The 1934 Singapore Open, also known as the 1934 Singapore Badminton Championships, took place from 21 July – 18 November 1934 at the S.V.C Drill Hall in City Hall and the Clerical Union Hall in Balestier, Singapore. The ties were played over a few months with the first round ties being played on the 21st of July and the last (men's doubles final) was played on the 18th of November. There were no women's doubles competition being held due to the lack of entries.

Final results

References 

Singapore Open (badminton)
1934 in badminton